Portia Dawson (born August 2, 1971) is an American film and television actress. Her first role was in Vanilla Ice's movie, Cool as Ice. Her most notable television role was a recurring part on the 1990s sitcom Blossom as Anthony's girlfriend Rhonda Jo Applegate, but she has also had guest spots on shows such as Step By Step, Scrubs, Nip/Tuck, and Joey.

Filmography

External links

American film actresses
American television actresses
Living people
Place of birth missing (living people)
1971 births
21st-century American women